|}

The Future Champion Novices' Chase is a Grade 2 National Hunt steeplechase in Great Britain which is open to horses aged five years or older. It is run at Ayr, Scotland, over a distance of about 2 miles, 4 furlongs and 110 yards (4,163 metres), and during its running there are seventeen fences to be jumped. The race is for novice chasers, and it is scheduled to take place each year in April.

The event was formerly contested over 2 miles, and for a period it was known by various sponsored titles. It was renamed in 1988, and it was extended to 2 miles 4 furlongs and given Grade 1 status in 1991. It returned to its former length for a single running in 1995, and at this point it was relegated to Grade 2 level.

The Future Champion Novices' Chase is run at Ayr on the same afternoon as the Scottish Grand National. The winners Gingembre and Grey Abbey both subsequently achieved victory in the latter race.

Records
Leading jockey since 1968 (3 wins):
 Ron Barry – The Benign Bishop (1973), Easby Abbey (1975), Little Bay (1981)
 Jonjo O'Neill – Crofton Hall (1977), King Weasel (1978), Night Nurse (1979)
 Ruby Walsh - Val Solitaire (2003), Natal (2007), Pacha du Polder (2012)

Leading trainer since 1968 (7 wins):
 Paul Nicholls - See More Indians (1994), Valley Henry (2002), Val Solitaire (2003), Natal (2007), Pacha du Polder (2012), Le Mercurey (2016), Secret Investor (2019)

Winners since 1971

Earlier winners

 1968 – Certainement
 1969 – Chesapeake Bay
 1970 – Mischievous Monk

See also
 Horse racing in Scotland
 List of British National Hunt races

References

 Racing Post:
 pedigreequery.com – Future Champion Novices' Chase – Ayr.
 

National Hunt races in Great Britain
Ayr Racecourse
National Hunt chases
Horse racing in Scotland